was a representative poetess of the Nijō poetic school in the latter half of the Kamakura period. She was rewarded with  posthumously. She was a descendant of Fujiwara no Teika, and the daughter of Nijō Tameyo, a great poet. She was the wife of Crown Prince Takaharu-shinnō (later Emperor Go-Daigo-tennō).

At first, she served as Yūgimon'in to Princess Reishi, and later held an important position as Emperor Go-Nijō's lady-in-waiting. Around this time, the late 1300s, she started courting Imperial Prince Takaharu-shinnō, who was also a master of waka poetry. Following the death of Emperor Nijō in 1308, he became Crown Prince, and she became Crown Princess. She lived happily with Prince Takaharu-shinnō and had Imperial Prince Takanaga (also Takayoshi), and Imperial Prince Munenaga (also Muneyoshi), the most well-known poet of the Southern Court (also head priest of Enryaku-ji /Tendai-zasu ), who died prematurely before he ascended the throne. Emperor Go-Daigo, who ascended the throne after Tameko's death, became a protector of the Nijō poetic school and worked to promote it. As a result, through Ashikawa Takauji, the first shogun of the Ashikawa shogunate and a poet, who admired Emperor Go-Daigo, the Nijō poetic school had been the leading school for more than 500 years in the Middle Ages, early modern period and late modern period.

She influenced future generations, such as Kanze Nobumitsu’s noh play  (mid-Muromachi period). In addition to poetry, she had knowledge of Chinese literature and excelled in writing. She was praised as "the wife of honour" ("the great woman") because of her versatile personality.

Career

Imperial Poetess 

At first, Tameko served as Yūgimon'in to Princess Reishi, the favourite princess of Emperor Go-Uda . In 1303, she published her waka poems in the Kagen kyakushu, a 100-poem compilation of the Kōgen era hosted by Emperor Go-Uda (travelling poetry also included in the ). In 1303, her waka was selected in Shingosen Wakashū ("New Later Collection of Japanese Poems "), which was published in the same year, and she became an Imperial Compilation poet under the name Yūgimon'in Gon-dainagon.

Becoming a Crown Princess 
In the 1300s, Tameko began courting Prince Takaharu-shinnō (later Emperor Go-Daigo). The exact circumstances of how they met remain unknown, but since Prince Takaharu was an unrivaled poet in waka poetry of his time, it is believed that they met through the hobby of waka. Japanese historian, Toshiharu Hirata, speculated that her eldest son, Imperial Prince Takanaga, was born during the Tokuji period (1306–1308).

In Masukagami, he expresses his infinite love for Tameko through the verses "When I was a boy, I thought endlessly". Furthermore, even in terms of status, she was regarded as the lawful wife of the heir (it is after the death of Tameko that Prince Takaharu meets Empress consort Saionji Kishi). For example, in Hanazono Tenno Shinki ("The Records of Emperor Hanazono"), the family of Nijō Tamesada (grandchild of Tameyo) is called "gaike" (the birthplace of an empress or queen). Although he was defeated, Prince Takanaga later ran for the political dispute over the next crown prince at the recommendation of his father (found on a rolled paper letter, in Tsurumi University Library). Prince Takanaga, the eldest son of both Tameko and Takanaga, was assigned to Yoshida Sadafusa, one of the chief retainers of the Daikakuji Fudai daimyō, to which Takanaga belonged, [in Masukagami ("Spring Farewell")].

In 1306, she recited 30 poems written by Emperor Go-Uda (in Gyokuyō Wakashū, "Collection of Jeweled Leaves"). In March 1307, she participated in Sentoeigu uta-awase (poetry contest), the Shinsenzai Wakashū ("New Waka Collection of a Thousand Years").

Around the time of the birth of her eldest son, Prince Takanaga (August 24, 1307), Yūgimon'in (Princess Reishi) died of a sudden illness. After that, she began to serve as lady-in-waiting Emperor Go-Nijō, her husband's brother. In Gyokuyō Wakashū ("Collection of Jeweled Leaves"), she was called Go no Nijōin- Gon dainagon. However, about one year after the death of Yūgimon'in, Emperor Go-Nijō also died on September 10, 1308. With the sudden death of Emperor Go-Nijō, Prince Takaharu became Crown Prince .

After her eldest son, Tameko had , the third daughter of Prince Takaharu. In the  Onnasan no Miya is being referred to as Princess Tamako (1316–1339).

Furthermore, in 1311, she gave birth to Cloistered Imperial Prince Sonchō, the later Imperial Prince Munenaga.

However, Tameko died shortly after giving birth, long before her husband Prince Takaharu ascended to the throne in 1318. Shigeaki Mori, a Japanese historian, stated the year 1314 in the 1988/2007 revised edition, followed by the year 1311 or 1312 in the 1991/2013 revised edition. The Kokushi Daijiten states the year as ’around 1311’. Since Nijō Tamefuji, Tameko's brother was Saisho no Chujo ("Consultant Captain") from March 1309 to July 1313, it is possible to narrow down the year of death to 1311 or 1312. In either case, about five years after she met Prince Takaharu, she gave birth to Prince Munenaga and died shortly thereafter.

The fact that one of the leading poets of the Nijō poetic school and the future Emperor's wife died early shocked the members of the Nijō poetic school. In particular, Ton’a, who was one of the Waka Shitenno ("The Four Heavenly Kings of Waka"), wrote one dokueika (solitary poems) and three zotoka (exchanged poems) to mourn the death of Tameko. At that time, the Kyogoku school of poetry, which opposed the Nijō school of poetry, was regaining its power. The steadily editing of the imperial anthology  led by Fujiwara no Tamekane (also known as Kyōgoku no Tamekane), an opponent of Nijō Tameyo, further fueled the sorrow of the family.

After her death 
In 1318, Imperial Prince Takaharu ascended the throne as Emperor Go-Daigo. When the compilation of the  began, in memory of Tameko, he conferred her the Jusanmi (Junior Third Rank). Since then, Tameko has also been called Zo-Jusanmi Tameko (Junior Third Rank, posthumously conferred). According to Nobumitsu Kurihara, a woman of the late Edo period specialised in Yusoku-kojitsu (court and samurai rules of ceremony and etiquette), it is only after Fujiwara no Takushi (Sawako), the daughter of Emperor Ninmyo in the early Heian period, that the Emperor's daughter (second to Empress Chūgū ) was conferred the Jusanmi (Junior Third Rank) after her graduation. It is very rare for a princess from the time of the Crown Prince to be conferred a Junior Third Rank. It is said that this shows Emperor Go-Daigo's special affection for Tameko.

See also 

 the 96th emperor of Japan, according to the traditional order of succession. This was to be the last time the emperor had any power until the Meiji Restoration in 1868.
, was a Japanese poet, critic, calligrapher, novelist, anthologist, scribe, and scholar of the late Heian and early Kamakura periods. His influence was enormous, and he is counted as among the greatest of Japanese poets, and perhaps the greatest master of the waka form. 
 is the last division of classical Japanese history, running from 794 to 1185. The period is named after the capital city of Heian-kyō, or modern Kyoto. It is a period in Japanese history when Chinese influences were in decline and the national culture matured. The Heian period is also considered the peak of the Japanese imperial court and noted for its art, especially poetry and literature.

Notes

References

Sources
  
  
 
 
 
 
  
  
 
   Retrieved March 25, 2020
 
 
 
 
  - 上記の文庫化
  Retrieved October 24, 1991
  - 上記の文庫化. Retrieved January 25, 2013. 
 
 

1310s deaths
Year of birth unknown
14th-century Japanese calligraphers
Japanese calligraphers
Empresses consort
Emperor Go-Daigo
14th-century Japanese poets
Japanese women poets
Kamakura period
14th-century Japanese women writers